This is a complete list of the operas of the German composer Heinrich Marschner (1795–1861).

List

References
Sources
Palmer, A Dean (1992), 'Marschner, Heinrich' in The New Grove Dictionary of Opera, ed. Stanley Sadie (London) 

 
Lists of operas by composer
Lists of compositions by composer